Stuart Wells (born 18 September 1982) is an English former actor. He is best known for his role as Michael in the film Billy Elliot (2000). Wells turned 17 during the filming, but he portrayed an 11-year-old.

In 2001, Wells quit acting to join the British Army's 1st Battalion, Royal Regiment of Fusiliers. He left the Army in 2008 with the rank of corporal after serving three operational tours, including two in Iraq.

Wells' brother, John, is also a former member of the British Army.

Filmography

References

External links 
 

1982 births
English male child actors
English male film actors
English male television actors
Living people
People from Wallsend
Male actors from Tyne and Wear
20th-century English male actors
21st-century English male actors
Royal Regiment of Fusiliers soldiers
British Army personnel of the Iraq War